The 1961–62 Boston Bruins season was the Bruins' 38th season in the NHL. Earning 38 of a possible 140 points in the standings, the team's 0.271 points percentage was the worst in their history excluding their inaugural season in 1924-25, in which they captured 12 out of a possible 60 points (0.200). The team also endured a 20-game winless streak (16 losses and 4 ties) which included the entire month of February.

Offseason

Regular season

Final standings

Record vs. opponents

Schedule and results

Playoffs

Player statistics

Regular season
Scoring

Goaltending

Awards and records

Transactions

See also
1961–62 NHL season

References

External links

Boston Bruins seasons
Boston Bruins
Boston Bruins
Boston Bruins
Boston Bruins
1960s in Boston